The Movie of My Life is a 2017 Brazilian film written and directed by Selton Mello, who also stars in the film. It is based on the 2010 novel Un padre de película by Chilean writer Antonio Skármeta. Besides Mello, the film also stars Bruna Linzmeyer, Johnny Massaro, Bia Arantes and Vincent Cassel.

References

External links

2017 drama films
Brazilian drama films
Films based on Chilean novels
Films directed by Selton Mello
Films set on trains
2010s Portuguese-language films